Mary Caroline Blair or Mary Caroline, Duchess of Sutherland born Mary Caroline Michell (1848 – 27 May 1912) was a British scandalous duchess who broke convention and went to jail for interfering in her husband's will. She was nicknamed "Duchess Blair" but she was the Duchess of Sutherland. The Duke had been one of the richest people in Britain and Carbisdale Castle was built for her as a consolation prize when the dispute was settled.

Life
Blair was born in Oxford in 1848 to Richard Michell principal of Hertford College, Oxford, and his wife Amelia Blair. She had one brother - Arthur Mitchell.  In 1872 she married Arthur Kindersley Blair, formerly a Captain in the 71st Highland Light Infantry. He had resigned his commission in 1861 and was then employed as land agent and business manager by George Sutherland-Leveson-Gower, 3rd Duke of Sutherland, who was one of the richest people in Britain, owning 1.4 million acres of land and Stafford House, a mansion in London. The Queen visited Stafford House and was known for noting that Stafford House was more of a palace than her own home.
Mary Blair became the Duke's mistress and when in 1883 her husband died in a shooting accident there was speculation that it was suicide or murder, although the official verdict was accidental death. The affair continued after her husband's death, but in 1889 she caused a scandal when she and the Duke married only four months after the death of the Duke's estranged wife. This broke the convention that widowers should not remarry for a year and it went against written advice to the Duke from Queen Victoria. Blair now had a high rank in British society but she was not welcome at any society event.

In 1892 the Duke died and Blair was due to inherit instead of the children from the Duke's first marriage including Cromartie Sutherland-Leveson-Gower, 4th Duke of Sutherland. The will was contested and the case was confused because Blair had arranged for documents to be burnt. The judge sent her to Holloway Jail for six weeks. An agreement was made and Blair was given sufficient funds to build Carbisdale Castle.

The castle was built just outside the family's lands and it had a clock tower with three faces. The fourth face had no clock as it faced the family's lands and it was said that Blair did not wish to "give them the time of day". Blair bought paintings and sculptures including Andromeda by Pasquale Romanelli.

Blair's third husband was Sir Albert Rollit. She died in London on 27 May 1912.

References

1848 births
1912 deaths
People from Oxford
Sutherland
Leveson-Gower family